Cao Lin (died 5 February 251) was an imperial prince of the state of Cao Wei in the Three Kingdoms period of China. He was a son of Cao Pi, the first Wei emperor, and the biological father of Cao Mao, the fourth Wei emperor.

Life
Cao Lin's father was Cao Pi, the first emperor of Wei. His mother, whose maiden family name was Qiu (仇), was a concubine of Cao Pi holding the rank of zhaoyi (昭儀; translated "Lady of Bright Deportment"). He was enfeoffed as the Prince of Hedong (河東王) in 222 during the reign of his father. In 225, his title was changed to "Prince of Guantao" (館陶王).

In 227, after Cao Pi's death, Cao Lin's half-brother Cao Rui succeeded their father and became the second emperor of Wei. Cao Rui treated Cao Lin in an exceptionally generous manner in accordance with their father's final wishes. Cao Lin was known for being prone to domestic violence; he abused and killed servants and concubines alike. In 232, his title was changed again to "Prince of Donghai" (東海王). He died on 5 February 251 during the reign of Cao Fang, the third emperor of Wei. He was honoured with the posthumous title "Prince Ding" (定王).

Cao Lin had two sons: Cao Qi (曹啟) and Cao Mao (曹髦). The elder one, Cao Qi, inherited his princedom and became the next Prince of Donghai. Over the reigns of the subsequent Wei emperors, the number of taxable households in the Donghai princedom increased until it reached 6,200. Cao Lin's younger son, Cao Mao, initially held the title "Duke of Gaogui District" (高貴鄉公). In 254, following Cao Fang's death, Empress Dowager Guo selected Cao Mao to be the fourth emperor of Wei. In accordance with imperial customs, Cao Mao was adopted as a posthumous son of Cao Rui so that his succession would be considered legitimate.

Family
Sons:
 Cao Qi, Prince Donghai
 Cao Mao, Emperor (241–260)

Ancestry

See also
 Lists of people of the Three Kingdoms
 Cao Wei family trees

Notes

References

 Chen, Shou (3rd century). Records of the Three Kingdoms (Sanguozhi).
 Pei, Songzhi (5th century). Annotations to Records of the Three Kingdoms (Sanguozhi zhu).

Cao Wei imperial princes
3rd-century births
251 deaths